The 1949 West Virginia Mountaineers football team was an American football team that represented West Virginia University as an independent during the 1949 college football season. In its second and final season under head coach Dudley DeGroot, the team compiled a 4–6–1 record and was outscored by a total of 275 to 227. The team played its home games at Mountaineer Field in Morgantown, West Virginia. Peter Zinaich was the team captain.

Schedule

References

West Virginia
West Virginia Mountaineers football seasons
West Virginia Mountaineers football